Maneka Sorcar (real name Parama Sorcar) is a magician from India and elder daughter of P. C. Sorcar Jr. She worked as an assistant to her father in several shows and till March 2012 she had performed over 250 magic shows. Sorcar is married to Susmit Ranjan Haldar. In 2004, Maneka teamed up with her father to create an illusion of a disappearing Taj Mahal, followed by the appearance of a bicycle ride across the surface of Dal Lake.

Early life 

Maneka Sorcar is the elder daughter of Prodip C. Sorcar or Magician P.C. Sorcar Jr. and Jayashri Sorcar and the granddaughter of Protul Chandra Sorcar or Magician P.C. Sorcar. Her two younger sisters Moubani Sorcar and Mumtaz Sorcar are film actresses.

References

External links 
 

Indian magicians
Artists from Kolkata
Bengali people
Living people
Female magicians
Maneka
Year of birth missing (living people)